The Immaculate Conception Cathedral is a Roman Catholic cathedral in Datong District, Taipei, Taiwan. The Latin Rite church serves as the see of the Metropolitan Archdiocese of Taipei (Archidioecesis Taipehensis; 天主教台北總教區) that was created by Pope Pius XII with the Bull "Gravia illa Christi".

History
The original building was built by Spanish in 1629, but was destroyed in a raid. Between 1911 and 1914, a new church was built in the Gothic style. During World War II, the church was bombed in 1945 and then replaced with a simpler structure. Reconstruction began in 1959, ending in May 1961.

Activities
All Masses and other religious services in the cathedral are offered in Mandarin Chinese.

Transportation
The church is accessible within walking distance west of Shuanglian Station of the Taipei Metro.

See also
 Roman Catholicism in Taiwan

References

External links
 
 Roman Catholic Archdiocese of Taipei

1889 establishments in Taiwan
Churches in Taipei
Roman Catholic cathedrals in Taiwan
Roman Catholic churches completed in 1961
20th-century Roman Catholic church buildings